George Scott may refer to:

Arts and entertainment
George Scott, vocalist for gospel music group The Blind Boys of Alabama
George Scott III (1953–1980), American No Wave bassist
George C. Scott (1927–1999), American actor

Politics and government
George Scott (British Army officer) (died 1767), fought in Canada, governor of Grenada, 1762–1764
George Scott (broadcaster) (1925–1988), British author, broadcaster and Liberal Party candidate
George Scott, American politician in Pennsylvania; see 2018 United States House of Representatives elections in Pennsylvania
George Adam Scott (1874–1963), Canadian provincial politician
George Byng Scott (1824–1886), Administrator of the Northern Territory of Australia from 1863 to 1876
George Cromwell Scott (1864–1948), U.S. Representative from Iowa
George E. Scott (1860–1915), Wisconsin State Senator
George G. Scott (1811–1886), New York lawyer and politician
George M. Scott (Minnesota judge) (1922–2006), Minnesota Supreme Court justice
George M. Scott (West Virginia judge) (1929–2015), Justice of the Supreme Court of Appeals of West Virginia
George Montgomery Scott (1835–1915), mayor of Salt Lake City, Utah
George W. Scott (politician) (born 1937), American politician in the state of Washington
James George Scott (1851–1935), known as George Scott, journalist and colonial Burmese administrator

Sports
George Scott (boxer) (born 1966), Swedish boxer
George Scott (cricketer) (born 1995), English cricketer
George Scott (first baseman) (1944–2013), American baseball player
George Scott (footballer, born 1865) (1865–1937), Scottish footballer
George Scott (footballer, born 1885) (1885–1916), English football player
George Scott (footballer, born 1904) (1904–?), English football player
George Scott (footballer, born 1915) (1915–1942), Scottish footballer
George Scott (footballer, born 1944), Scottish football player for Tranmere Rovers
George Scott (pitcher) (1895–1962), American baseball player
George Scott (snooker player) (1928–1998), English snooker player
George Scott (wrestler) (1929–2014), Scottish-born Canadian wrestler
George Arbuthnot Scott (1879–1927), cricketer
George W. Scott (American football), American football and track and field coach

Writers
George Scot of Pitlochie (died 1685), wrote a 1683 book extolling the virtues of Scottish settlement in East Jersey
George Firth Scott (1862–1935), journalist and writer
George Ryley Scott (1886–c. 1980), British author of books about sexual intercourse

Others
Lord George Scott (1866–1947), Scottish cricketer and soldier
George Scott (missionary) (1804–1874), Scottish Methodist missionary to Sweden
George Douglas Scott, English chief executive officer
George Gilbert Scott (1811–1878), Victorian architect
George Gilbert Scott Jr. (1839–1897), his son, also an architect
George Herbert Scott (1888–1930), British airship pilot and engineer
George Ian Scott (1907–1989), Scottish ophthalmic surgeon and president of the Royal College of Surgeons of Edinburgh
George Lewis Scott (1708–1780), English royal tutor, encyclopedist, and dilettante
George Washington Scott (1829–1903), industrialist and philanthropist, benefactor of Agnes Scott College
Lynching of George Scott, on December 12, 1880

See also